Alexander Groiß (born 1 July 1998) is a German professional footballer who plays as a defensive midfielder for  club SpVgg Bayreuth.

Career statistics

References

External links
 
 

Living people
1998 births
People from Aalen
Sportspeople from Stuttgart (region)
Footballers from Baden-Württemberg
German footballers
Association football defenders
Germany youth international footballers
VfB Stuttgart II players
Karlsruher SC players
1. FC Saarbrücken players
SpVgg Bayreuth players
2. Bundesliga players
3. Liga players
Regionalliga players